Meanus is a small village and townland in County Limerick, Ireland, approximately 19km south of Limerick City. As of the 2011 census, the townland of Meanus had a population of 63 people.

The village has a Catholic church, a GAA pitch (Camogue Rovers GAA), two pubs, and a community centre. The Catholic church, Saint Mary's Roman Catholic Church, was built between 1845 and 1846, and was renovated in 1999.

The River Camogue runs close to the village. Nearby villages include Fedamore, Bruff, Athlacca, Croom, and Crecora.

References

Towns and villages in County Limerick